Information Age is the third studio album by hip-hop duo dead prez. It was released on October 16, 2012 digitally and January 29, 2013 physically.

Track listing

Release History

References

External links 

Dead Prez albums
2012 albums
2013 albums
Political music albums by American artists